Favartia (Murexiella) taylorae taylorae is a species of sea snail, a marine gastropod mollusk in the family Muricidae, the murex snails or rock snails.

Description
Original description: "Shell small for genus, with oval body, elevated spire and long siphonal canal; 7 varices per whorl; varices with 6 large, strongly recurved spines; intervarical areas with 6 large fimbriated cords; siphonal canal with 2 large recurved spines; last spines of siphonal canal greatly recurved, almost touching varical spines; shoulder sharply angled; spire whorls tabulate; shell color rosy-tan with dark rose spots in pits at the base of each varix; siphonal canal pinkish-rose; interior of aperture pinkish-rose."

The shell grows to a length of 16 mm

Distribution
Locus typicus: "(Trawled from) 200 metres depth
off Cedar Key, Florida, USA."

This species is distributed in the Gulf of Mexico along Florida.

References

 Rosenberg, G., F. Moretzsohn, and E. F. García. 2009. Gastropoda (Mollusca) of the Gulf of Mexico, pp. 579–699 in Felder, D.L. and D.K. Camp (eds.), Gulf of Mexico–Origins, Waters, and Biota. Biodiversity. Texas A&M Press, College Station, Texas

Gastropods described in 1987
Favartia